The Composition of Yards and Perches or the Statute of Ells and Perches was a medieval English statute defining the length of the barleycorn, inch, foot, yard, and perch, as well as the area of the acre. Its date has been estimated at 1266–1303.

The Latin text from the manuscript known as BL Cotton MS Claudius D 2 is translated in Ruffhead's Statutes at Large) as 

A similar statement is made in Liber Horn (as published in The Statutes of the Realm): 

The Composition of Yards and Perches belongs to a class of documents known as Statutes of uncertain date generally thought to be from c. 1250 to 1305. Although not originally statutes, they gradually acquired the force of law. In some early statute books Composition of Yards and Perches was appended to another statute of uncertain date, the Statute for the Measuring of Land also known as Statutum de Admensuratione Terrase, An Ordinance for Measuring of Land, sometimes (erroneously) listed as 33° Edward I. st. 6. (1305). The Composition of Yards and Perches was repealed by the Weights and Measures Act 1824 (5 George IV c. 74, par. 23).

See also
 Weights and Measures Acts

References

English laws
Systems of units